Giovanni Cesari (25 June 1843 – 10 March 1904) was an Italian singer with a soprano acuto, or high soprano voice.

Together with Alessandro Moreschi, Domenico Salvatori and Domenico Mustafà, Cesari was a famous castrato singer of the late 19th century. Born in the town of Frosinone, he was dropped off at an orphanage in 1852 by his parents. Here he started his musical education under the direction of Gaetano Capocci, financed by the Sistine Chapel. He was then admitted, upon completing his studies, as a soprano to the Sistine Chapel Choir at the age of 17 in 1861. Cesari was overall a remarkable soprano, and although he possessed a veiled voice, he was a master of song with an optimal intonation and an exquisite trill.

In addition to being a soprano at the Sistine Chapel Choir, he was also director of sacred music at several churches of Rome (Santa Lucia al Gonfalone, Santo Spirito in Sassia, etc.), and he used to arrange concerts in Rome. In 1896 he was promoted to vice-director of the Cappella, sometimes substituting for the older maestro Domenico Mustafà. He died prematurely in Rome in 1904.

His voice can be heard, rather faintly, together with those of the other choristers on the Sistine Chapel recordings made by Fred Gaisberg in 1902.

External links
Short biography

1843 births
1904 deaths
Cesari
Cesari
19th-century Italian male actors
Italian male stage actors
19th-century Italian male singers